Cuddalore Municipal Corporation is the civic body governing city of Cuddalore in Indian state of Tamil Nadu. Municipal Corporation mechanism in India was introduced during British Rule with formation of municipal corporation in Madras (Chennai) in 1688, later followed by municipal corporations in Bombay (Mumbai) and Calcutta (Kolkata) by 1762. Cuddalore Municipal Corporation is headed by Mayor of city and governed by Commissioner.

History and administration 

Cuddalore Municipal Corporation in Cuddalore district was formed in year 2021 and is one of the 21 municipal corporations in Tamil Nadu. Cuddalore Municipal Corporation will have a Commissioner, Mayor, a Council, a Standing Committee, a Wards Committee for facilitating various works.

Factors driving Cuddalore Municipal Corporation 

Cuddalore Municipal Corporation is driven by following factors:

  Population Growth.
  Increase in annual Income.
  Improvement of Roads.
  Providing drinking water.
  Improving landscape.
  Improving employment opportunities.
  Improving relations between police and public.
  Waste Management.
  Arranging facilities during natural calamities.
  Establishing industrial units.
  Providing sewage connection.

Cuddalore Municipal Corporation local body polls 

Cuddalore Municipal Corporation members are elected through local body polls. They then elect the Mayor from among themselves. The first election to the corporation was held on 19 February 2022.

List of mayors of Cuddalore

See also 
 List of municipal corporations in India

References

External links 
 Official Website

Municipal corporations in Tamil Nadu
Cuddalore